The 1949–50 Scottish League Cup final was played on 29 October 1949, at Hampden Park in Glasgow and was the final of the fourth Scottish League Cup competition. The final was a Fife derby match contested by East Fife and Dunfermline Athletic. East Fife won the match 3–0 thanks to goals by Davie Duncan, Charlie Fleming and Henry Morris.

Match details

External links
 Soccerbase
 Video highlights from official Pathé News archive

1949 10
League Cup Final
Dunfermline Athletic F.C. matches
East Fife F.C. matches
1940s in Glasgow
October 1949 sports events in the United Kingdom